The 2005 UEFA Cup Final was the final match of the 2004–05 UEFA Cup, the 34th season of the UEFA Cup, UEFA's second-tier club football tournament. The match was contested by Sporting CP and CSKA Moscow; CSKA won the match 3–1. Sporting CP opened the scoring in the first half from full-back Rogério, before Aleksei Berezutskiy equalised in the second half.

The match was played at the Estádio José Alvalade – home ground of finalists Sporting CP – in Lisbon, Portugal, on 18 May 2005. Until then, it was the third European football final to be held in Portugal, after the 1967 European Cup Final, which was held in another Lisbon venue, the Estádio Nacional, and the 1992 European Cup Winners' Cup Final, which was held at the Estádio da Luz.

Venue
José Alvalade Stadium was announced as the final venue on 5 February 2004, following the decision of the UEFA Executive Committee meeting in Nyon, Switzerland.

Route to the final

Match

Details

See also
2004–05 UEFA Cup
2004–05 UEFA Champions League
2005 UEFA Champions League Final
2005 UEFA Super Cup
PFC CSKA Moscow in European football
Sporting CP in European football

References

External links
2004–05 season at UEFA.com

Final
International club association football competitions hosted by Portugal
UEFA Cup Final 2005
UEFA Cup Final 2005
UEFA Cup Final 2005
2005
Uefa
2004–05 in Portuguese football
2000s in Lisbon
May 2005 sports events in Europe